Carpathia: A Dramatic Poem is the second studio album by German gothic metal band The Vision Bleak, released on 29 August 2005 through Prophecy Productions. A digipak edition containing four additional live bonus tracks was also released.

Track listing

Trivia
 Track 4 has its name and lyrics inspired by H. P. Lovecraft's short story "The Dreams in the Witch House".
 Tracks 6 to 8 form a trilogy based on the life of the "Mad Arab" Abdul Alhazred, the author of the fictional Necronomicon on H. P. Lovecraft's Cthulhu Mythos.

Personnel

The Vision Bleak
 Ulf Theodor Schwadorf (Markus Stock) – vocals, guitars, bass, keyboards
 Allen B. Konstanz (Tobias Schönemann) – vocals, drums, keyboards

Guest musicians
 Thomas Helm – additional tenor vocals
 Sophia Brommer – additional vocals (track 5)

Miscellaneous staff
 Martin Koller – production

External links
 The Vision Bleak's official website

The Vision Bleak albums
2005 albums
Cthulhu Mythos music